Erling Lindberg (4 March 1903 – 29 May 1968) was a Norwegian footballer. He played in one match for the Norway national football team in 1929.

References

External links
 

1903 births
1968 deaths
Norwegian footballers
Norway international footballers
Place of birth missing
Association footballers not categorized by position